Kamal Kumar Majumdar (17 November 1914 – 9 February 1979) was a major fiction-writer of the Bengali language. The novel Antarjali Jatra is considered his most notable work.

Early life
Majumdar was the son of Prafullachandra Majumdar and Renukamoyee Majumdar. Prafullachandra used to serve in the police department. Renukamoyee had keen literary interest and thus Kamalkumar was exposed to modern literary thoughts and trends from his childhood.

His parents were originally from Taki, a town in the 24 Parganas district (now in North 24 Parganas district), but the family shifted to Rikhia. Kamalkumar spent his childhood and adolescence in Kolkata, India. He started his studies in a school called "Bishnupur Shiksha Sangha" in Bishnupur but dropped formal studies before completing high school. For sometime, he studied Sanskrit in a Tol and learned sitar from a local maestro. In 1937 he established a magazine called "Ushnish" where he used to write under his real name as well as a number of pen names. But during 1944–45 he devoted himself mostly to painting. During 1937–38 he got numerous offers for going abroad which he refused.

Kamal Kumar was married to Dayamayee Majumdar and his younger brother was a renowned painter, Nirode Mazumdar. Their younger sister Shanu Lahiri (1928 – 2013) was also a noted painter and art educator.

Works

Stories
 Lal Juto (The Red Shoes)
 Madhu (Honey)
 Jal (Water )
 Teish (Twenty Three)
 Mallika Bahar
 Matilal Paddi
 Tahader Katha (Their Tale)
 Fauji Banduk
 Neem Annapurna (19kamalkumar65)
 Kayed Khana
 Rukminikumar
 Lupta Pujabidhi
 Khelar Bichar (Rules of the game)
 Khelar Drishyabali (Scenes of the game)
 Anitter Dayvag
 Konkal Eleigy (Elegy of the skeletons)
 Dwadash Mrittika
 Pingolabat
 Khelar aromvo (Start of the game)
 Bagan Keyari
 Aar chokhe jol
 Bagan Poridhi
 Kal e aatotai
 Justice Justice
 Prem (The Desire)
 Babu
 Princess
 Amod Bostumi
 Koschito Jibonchorit : tinti khosra

Novels
 Antarjali Jatra (The Final Passage, 1962)
 Golap Sundori
 Anila Smorone
 Shyam-Nouka
 Suhasinir Pometom
 Pinjare Bosiya Shuk
 Khelar Pratibha
 Shoborimangal

Other work
 Number of paintings
 Number of wood cut sculptures 
 Edited a notable magazine named ANKA BHAVNA

A notable article on ANKA BHAVNA by mathematician Narayan Chandra Ghosh has been published in the December 2015 issue of Sristir Ekosh Satak Patrika. Before that he wrote articles on ANKA BHAVNA in Pratibimbha, Samakal 0 Bibriti. A book titled KAMAL KUMAR MAJUMDER o Anka Bhavan Edited by Narayan Ch Ghosh is most popular one.

Movies based on his work
The movies such as Neem Annapurna directed by Buddhadev Dasgupta, Antarjali Jatra by Gautam Ghosh, Sati by Aparna Sen and Tahader Katha by Buddhadev Dasgupta were based on the novels and stories written by Majumdar. Gautam Ghosh made a Hindi movie named Mahayatra based on Majumdar's novel Antarjali Jatra.

Lal Juto, a Bengali film made by a student and based on Majumdar's short story of the same name, won the Best Creative Idea Award at the 11th Shanghai International Film Festival.

References

External links 

 Shoaib Gibran (2010), Kamalkumar Choritom, Shuddhasshar www.shuddhashar.com, 
 Shoaib Gibran (2009), Kamalkumar Majumdarer Upannayasher Karankaushal,Bangla Academy,
 ANKA BHAVNAR ANKA (2015) Narayan Ch Ghosh, December 2015 issue of Sristir Ekosh Satak Patrika. 
 ANKA BHAVNA (2013) Narayan Ch Ghosh,Pratibimbha 
 ANKA BHAVNA (2013) Narayan Ch Ghosh, Samakal 0 Bibriti

Bengali writers
Bengali-language writers
Writers from Kolkata
1914 births
1979 deaths
20th-century Indian short story writers
20th-century Indian novelists
People from North 24 Parganas district
Novelists from West Bengal